Wöllstadt is a municipality in the Wetteraukreis in Hesse, Germany. It is located approximately 20 kilometers north of Frankfurt am Main.

References

Wetteraukreis